This is a list of presidents of The Asiatic Society of Bengal (Calcutta).

1700s

Sir William Jones (1784-1794)
Sir John Shore (1794-1799)
 Robert Chambers (1799)
Sir John Anstruther, 4th Baronet (1799-1807)

1800s

Henry Thomas Colebrooke (1807–?1815)
Francis Rawdon-Hastings, 1st Marquess of Hastings (1820-1825)
John Herbert Harington (1825-1828)
Charles Edward Grey (1828-1832)
Sir Edward Ryan (1832-1841)
Henry Thoby Prinsep (1842-1844)
William Wilberforce Bird (1844-1845)
Henry Hardinge, 1st Viscount Hardinge (1845)
William Wilberforce Bird (1846-1848)
James William Colvile (1848-1859)
Arthur Grote (1859–62)
Lt. Col. H. E. L. Thuillier (1863)
William Stephen Atkinson (1863)
Sir Edward Clive Bayley (1863–67)
Dr. Joseph Fayrer (1867–68)
Dr. Thomas Oldham (1868-1870)
Hon John Budd Phear (1870-1872)
Dr. Thomas Oldham (1873)
Lt. Col. H. Hyde (1873–74)
Sir Edward Clive Bayley  (1875)
Dr. Thomas Oldham (1875-1877)
Sir Edward Clive Bayley (1877-1878)
William Thomas Blanford (1878-1879)
Henry Benedict Medlicott (1879-1881)
Sir Ashley Eden (1881-1882)
Herbert John Reynolds (1882-1884)
Henry Francis Blanford (1884–85)
Dr. Rajendralal Mitra (1885)
Edwin Felix Thomas Atkinson (1886-1887)
James Waterhouse (1888-1890)
Henry Beveridge (1890-1891)
Sir Alfred Woodley Croft (1891-1892)
Sir Charles Alfred Elliott (1893-1894)
Charles James Lyall (1894-1895)
Alexander Pedler (1895-1896)
Dr. Augustus Frederic Rudolf Hoernle (1897-1898)
Sir Herbert Hope Risley (1898-1900)

1900s

Sir John Woodburn (1900-1901)
Charles Walter Bolton (1902-1905) (Chief Secretary to the Bengal Government)
Sir A. H. L. Fraser (1905-1907)
Sir Ashutosh Mukherjee (3 times) (1907-1908)
Sir Thomas Henry Holland (1909-1910)
Thomas Henry Digges La Touche (1910-1911) (Geologist, born 1855)
George Francis Angelo Harris (1911-1912) 
Thomas David, Baron Carmichael (1913-1915)
Sir Leonard Rogers (1915-1916)
Henry Hubert Hayden (1917-1918)
Haraprasad Shastri (1919-1920)
Sir Ashutosh Mukherjee (1921-1923)
Nelson Annandale (1923-1924)
Sir Rajendranath Mookherjee (1924-1925)
George H. Tipper (1926-1927) (Superintendent of the Geological Survey in India)
Dr. W. A. K. Christie (1927-1928) (Indian Geological Survey)
Dr. Upendranath Brahmachari (1928-1929)
Robert Beresford Seymour Sewell (1930-1931)
Justice C. C. Ghose (1932-1934)
Lewis Leigh Fermor (1934-1935)
Sir John Anderson (1936-1938)
Sir David Ezra (1938-1939)
Justice John Lort-Williams (1940-1941)
Dr C. S. Fox (1941-1942) (Director of the Geological Survey of India)
Dr Shyama Prasad Mookerjee (1942-1944)
Dr Meghnad Saha (1945-1946)
Justice Norman George Armstrong Edgley (1946-1947)
Dr Bimala Churn Law (1947-1948)
Dr D. West (1948)
Justice Ramaprasad Mookherjee (1948-1950)
Prof Sisir Kumar Mitra (1951-1953)
Prof S. K. Chatterji (1953-1955)
Dr D. M. Bose (1955-1957)
Dr S. N. Sen (1957-1959)
Dr Nalinaksha Dutt (1959-1961)
Dr A. C. Ukil (1961-1962)
Dr U. N. Ghoshal (1963-1964)
Dr K. N. Bagchi (1964-1965)
Prof R. C. Majumdar (1966-1968)
Prof Satyendra Nath Bose (1968-1969)
Prof S. K. Chatterji (1970-1971)
Prof Nirmal Kumar Bose (1972)
M. M. Basu (1972)
Dr B. Mukherji (1972-1974)
Prof. K. Saraswati (1975-1977)
Dr Gouri Nath Sastri (1977-1978)
Dr D. Bose (1979-1981)
P. C. Gupta (1981-1982)
S. N. Sen (1983)
Dr R. K. Pal (1983-1985)
Dr Sukumar Sen (1985-1987)
Dr M. M. Chakraborty (1987-1988)
In administration (1988-1992)
Dr M M Chakraborty (1992-1996)
Prof Dilip Kumar Biswas (1997-1999)
Prof Bhaskar Roychowdhury (1999-2001)

2000s

Prof Biswanath Banerji (2001-2002)
Prof Amalendu De (2002-2003)
Prof Biswanath Banerji (2004-2012)
Prof Pallab Sengupta (2012-2014)
Prof Ramakanta Chakraborty (2014-2016)
Prof Isha Mahammad (2016-2020)
Prof Swapan Pramanick (2020-)

References and sources
References

Sources
 Official website of The Asiatic Society, ''Presidents and Secretaries of The Asiatic Society

Lists of office-holders in India